was a JR East railway station located in Minamisanriku, Miyagi Prefecture, Japan. The station was destroyed by the 2011 tsunami and surrounding railway track was washed away. Services have now been replaced by a provisional bus rapid transit line.

Lines
Rikuzen-Togura Station was served by the Kesennuma Line, and was located 29.5 rail kilometers from the terminus of the line at Maeyachi Station.

Station layout
Rikuzen-Togura Station had a single side platform serving traffic in both directions. The station was unattended.

History
Rikuzen-Togura Station opened on 11 December 1977. The station was absorbed into the JR East network upon the privatization of the Japan National Railways (JNR) on April 1, 1987. Operations were discontinued after the station was severely damaged by the 2011 Tōhoku earthquake and tsunami, and rail services have now been replaced by a bus rapid transit line.

Surrounding area
Japan National Route 45
Japan National Route 398
Shizuhama Port
Togura Post Office
Togura Elementary School
Togura Middle School

References

External links

 JR East Station information 
  video of a train trip from Shizugawa Station to Rikuzen-Yokoyama Station in 2009, passing Rikuzen-Togura Station at around 03:48 minutes without stopping.  Satellite photos (e.g., in Google Maps) showed that some sections of the railway were completely washed away by the 2011 tsunami, particularly near the departure point of Shizugawa Station and the vicinity of Rikuzen-Togura Station, while other sections remained intact.

Railway stations in Miyagi Prefecture
Kesennuma Line
Railway stations in Japan opened in 1977
Railway stations closed in 2011